

Group A

Head coach:  Miroslav Přerost

Head coach:  Harri Rindell

Head coach:  Leonids Tambijevs

Head coach:  Roger Rönnberg

Head coach:  Sean Simpson

Group B

Head coach:  Steve Spott

Head coach:  Ernst Höfner

Head coach:  Mikhail Varnakov

Head coach:  Ernest Bokroš

Head coach:  Phil Housley

External links
worldjunior2013.com

Rosters
World Junior Ice Hockey Championships rosters